Nathaniel Marvin Wolff (born December 17, 1994) is an American actor and musician. He gained recognition for composing the music for The Naked Brothers Band (2007–2009), a Nickelodeon television series he starred in with his younger brother, Alex, that was created by their actress mother, Polly Draper. Wolff's jazz pianist father, Michael Wolff, coproduced the series' soundtrack albums, The Naked Brothers Band (2007) and I Don't Want to Go to School (2008), both of which ranked the 23rd spot on the Top 200 Billboard Charts.

Following the ending of the Nickelodeon series, Wolff and his brother formed the music duo Nat & Alex Wolff, and they released the album Black Sheep in 2011. He later became known for his lead role in the film Paper Towns (2015), and other films such as Admission, Behaving Badly, and Palo Alto, each of which premiered in 2013. Wolff also co-starred in the highly successful theatrical film, The Fault in Our Stars (2014) before portraying Ed in the film Ashby in 2015. He portrayed Light Turner in the Netflix adaptation of Death Note (2017).

He and his younger brother starred in the 2018 film Stella's Last Weekend, which was written and directed by their mother, who also starred in the film.

Early life
Wolff was born in Los Angeles, California, to jazz pianist Michael Wolff and actress Polly Draper. He is the older brother of actor/musician and singer-songwriter Alex Wolff. His maternal grandfather is venture capitalist and civic leader William Henry Draper III, and he is also a nephew of venture capitalist Timothy C. Draper, cousin to actress Jesse Draper, and a great-grandson of banker and diplomat William Henry Draper, Jr. His father is Jewish, while his mother is from a Christian background; Wolff was brought up "culturally Jewish."

Career
When Nat and his younger brother, Alex, were toddlers, they arose from the bathtub shouting, "We're the naked brothers band!" Their father tells of Nat teaching himself to play major and minor chords on the piano when he was four years old. As his father recalls: "I asked him, How did you learn them?' He said, 'Dad, they're right here.' I said, 'What are those chords?' He said, 'These are my proud chords." By age five, Wolff had started writing his own songs, and by the time he was in preschool, he constructed a band called The Silver Boulders with his best friends.

Nat first gained notice in the wake of the September 11 attacks when he held his birthday party outside his apartment, which is where he performed his composition titled "Firefighters". The benefit concert was a success; it raised over $46,000 and was donated to the children of New York City Fire Department's Squad 18. Alex eventually joined the band as the drummer; both boys were emboldened by The Beatles. When Wolff was young, he put signs on his bedroom door stating: "I want to be a child actor!" At first, his mother refused because she did not want her children exposed to stardom when they were young. As a result, Draper decided to appease Nat by letting him film his own sitcom called Don't Eat Off My Plate.

He began his acting career Off-Broadway with a minor role in his mother's play Getting Into Heaven (2003) and in the Off-Broadway production of Heartbeat to Baghdad (2004), both at The Flea Theater. He later gained recognition, at the age of nine, for starring in and contributing lead vocals, instrumentation, and lyrics for the 2005 musical comedy film The Naked Brothers Band: The Movie, which was written and directed by his mother, and obtained the Audience Award for a Family Feature Film at the Hamptons International Film Festival. The film was bought by Nickelodeon as the pilot to the television series of the same name (2007–09) which was created, written, produced and directed by his mother, while his father co-starred and produced and supervised the music. Moreover, Nat's younger brother was featured in the ensemble cast and also wrote and performed the music.

The series earned him one BMI Cable Award for composing the series' music, as well as two Young Artist Award nominations and one KCA nomination for Best TV Actor. The show produced two soundtrack albums and the single "Crazy Car" reached #83 on the Top 100 Billboard Charts. Wolff, who was six when he wrote the song, is believed to be the youngest person ever to compose a charting song on the Billboard charts. His unreleased song "Yes We Can", in honor of President Barack Obama, was heard by the President and his two daughters who enjoyed it and called him. Prior to the encounter, Nat had the occasion of meeting Obama, who emboldened him to write the composition.

Wolff's other film credits include appearing in the Nickelodeon television film special Mr. Troop Mom (2009), the romantic comedy New Year's Eve (2011), and the independent comedic drama Peace, Love & Misunderstanding (2011). In 2010, he starred in his brother's play What Would Woody Do? at the Flea Theater. Wolff co-starred in the comedy film Admission (2013), Palo Alto (2013), and the comedy film Behaving Badly (2014). That same year, his supporting role in the drama film The Fault in Our Stars earned him two Teen Choice Awards in the categories of Choice Movie: Scene Stealer and Choice Movie: Chemistry.

In 2015, Wolff starred in Paper Towns, his second film adaptation of a John Green novel following The Fault in Our Stars. He played the lead role, Quentin "Q" Jacobsen, a teenage boy in love with his neighbor (played Cara Delevingne). Writing for Variety, critic Justin Chang stated: "Wolff, who's present in just about every scene, manages to hold the center as a young man who isn't overly concerned about either standing out or fitting in, and whose behavior can often be as hesitant as it is impulsive." He will star in the off-Broadway revival of Sam Shepard's play Buried Child with Ed Harris and Taissa Farmiga. The production is scheduled to run from February 2 through March 13, 2016.

In 2017, Wolff starred in Death Note, a Netflix film based on the manga of the same name, and the romantic comedy Home Again. In 2018, he appeared in the independent thriller Rosy, directed by Jess Bond, and the drama Stella's Last Weekend, directed by his mother, Polly Draper, and costarring his brother, Alex. In 2019, he appeared in Good Posture, directed by Dolly Wells, and in 2020 appeared in Mortal, directed by André Øvredal.

Filmography

Films

Television

Stage

Albums
Soundtrack albums as part of the TV series The Naked Brothers Band
 2007: The Naked Brothers Band
 2008: I Don't Want to Go to School

Studio albums as duo Nat & Alex Wolff
 2011: Black Sheep

Awards and nominations

References

External links

 
 

1994 births
21st-century American male actors
21st-century American musicians
American child singers
American male child actors
American male film actors
American male stage actors
American male television actors
American male voice actors
American people of Jewish descent
Living people
Male actors from Los Angeles
Musicians from Los Angeles
The Naked Brothers Band members
Singer-songwriters from California
21st-century American singers
Draper family